Bathroom Kornasian  is from the Qajar period and is located in Dezful, Iran, south of the Kornasian neighborhood. This work is listed in the National Iranian Art Series with number 8477.

Renaming 
The Kornasian Bathroom was renamed in 2006 by the Cultural Heritage, Handicrafts and Tourism Organization of Iran and is now known as the Museum of Anthropology in Dezful.

Fire in the bathroom 
The Kornasian Bathroom was set on fire on Monday, March 28, 2016. The Dezful County Fire Department's chief executive declared that it a technical problem in the electricity system. He said that the fire had not spread to the interior of the historic bath. It suffered smoke and power outages. The bathroom reopened on April 2, 2016.

Other names 
This monument was also known in the past by other names such as the Haj Nasir bathroom  and the New bathroom .

Reasons for naming 
The reason for the renaming of the Haj Nasir bath into the Kornasian Bathroom was that the nomads who migrated from the Korna Mountains to the area later became their place of residence.

See also 

 Cultural Heritage, Handicrafts and Tourism Organization of Iran

References 



National works of Iran